Hebbasuru Vittal Rao Rajeeva is an Indian politician.

Early life
Rajeeva was born in Hebbasuru, Chamarajanagar. His father was Hebbasuru Vithalarao and his mother was Saralamba. He studied at JSS, Chamarajanagar, and his degree in Science (BSc) at the University of Mysore.

Career
Rajeeva is a member of the BJP and of the RSS. He has worked in the Krishnaraja constituency since 1994. He was appointed general secretary of the Mysore BJP. In 2004 Rajeeva instituted the Pramati Educational and Cultural Trust. In 2008 he became the chairman of the Yuva Dasara program in Mysore. He became co-convener for BJP Sahakari Prakoshta Karnataka in 2010. He is the Director and Vice president, Federation of Karnataka state co-operatives. In October 2014, Rajeev set up a Rajeev Sneha Balaga and supported Narendra Modi's Swachh Bharat campaign.  More than 150 programs have been organised in different parts of the city.

Awards
 Pride of Mysore in 2017 by Pragathi Pratisthan
 Basava Rathna award in June 2017

References

Bharatiya Janata Party politicians from Karnataka
Kannada people
Politicians from Mysore
1968 births
Living people